Pseudosasa cantorii is a species of bamboo originally from China. It can grow up to a height of 1.5–2 meters.

References

Bambusoideae